Vincent Keith Brooks (born October 24, 1958) is a retired United States Army general who last commanded United States Forces Korea, United Nations Command, and ROK-U.S. Combined Forces Command. He previously served as the commanding general of United States Army Pacific and prior to that as the commanding general of Third Army.   Brooks was the United States Central Command Deputy Director of Operations during the War in Iraq, and frequently briefed the media, which raised his public profile. He also served as the Chief of Army Public Affairs The Pentagon. He was the deputy commander of 1st Cavalry Division in Baghdad during the 2006–2008 "surge" and upon returning to the United States became the commanding general of the same division. He later was commanding general of the 1st Infantry Division. Brooks assumed command in Korea on April 30, 2016 and was succeeded by Robert B. Abrams in November 2018, and he retired on January 1, 2019.

Family
Brooks was born in Anchorage, Alaska, on October 24, 1958. He grew up as an Army brat in a prominent military family in California. His father, Major General Leo A. Brooks Sr., and brother, Brigadier General Leo A. Brooks Jr., both retired after careers in the United States Army. His uncle, Francis K. Brooks, was the majority leader of the Vermont House of Representatives and a member of the Vermont Senate. Brooks attended Thomas Jefferson High School in Alexandria, Virginia for two years, and then Jesuit High School in Carmichael, California, where he graduated in 1976. He was a varsity basketball player, and decided to follow his brother to United States Military Academy at West Point to earn a commission as an officer.

Military service

At West Point, Brooks was the academy's first African-American First Captain, the highest position (Cadet Brigade Commander) a cadet can hold, an appointment that brought much public visibility at an early age in life. He graduated from West Point in 1980. After graduating, Brooks served in South Korea and Kosovo among other places. In Kosovo, he concurrently served as the deputy commander of the U.S. force in Kosovo (Task Force Falcon) and as commander of the 1st Brigade, 3rd Infantry Division based at Fort Stewart in Georgia. From that position he moved to the Joint Chiefs of Staff at the Pentagon. While serving there he was temporarily assigned to be Deputy Director of Operations at United States Central Command (CENTCOM). Returning to the Pentagon and the Joint Staff in April 2003, he became the Lead Strategic Planner for the Global War on Terrorism working closely with the CIA, the Departments of State, Treasury and Justice, the FBI and the military's United States Special Operations Command (SOCOM).

In his role as Deputy Director of Operations, Brooks also became the spokesperson of CENTCOM, the main force in the Middle East. At that time he was the youngest general officer in the army. From 2006 to 2008 Brooks served as the Deputy Commanding General of the 1st Cavalry Division, serving for fifteen months in Baghdad as second-in-command of the main effort (Multinational Division – Baghdad) stabilizing the Iraqi capital city and province during what is now called "The Surge." Upon return from Iraq, he took command of the 1st Cavalry Division until April 2008. Following an assignment as the Deputy Commanding General of the Army's III (Third) Corps at Fort Hood, Texas, he again took command of a combat unit, serving as the Commanding General of the historic 1st Infantry Division at Fort Riley in Kansas from April 2009 to May 2011.  He deployed the unit to Iraq for a year, serving as U.S. Division – South, responsible for securing the heavily Shi'ite areas of the southern half of the country.  The headquarters was in Basra, Iraq. Following two years in a second division-level command, Brooks took command of U.S. Army Central and Third Army responsible for all U.S. Army operations throughout the Middle East and Central Asia (from Egypt to Kazakhstan). During this time, Brooks oversaw the reduction of forces in Iraq as well as the build up of forces in Afghanistan.

As the Commanding General of United States Army Pacific and as a part of the "Asia Pivot" of the Obama administration foreign policy, Brooks envisioned and executed the "Pacific Pathways" program. The program consists of a single United States Army unit that would move to different countries of the Asia and Pacific regions for up to three months at a time to develop first-hand understanding of the region. While initially criticized in some circles, the innovative approach has met high acclaim from the countries of the region and the units involved in the missions.

In March 2016, Brooks was nominated to command United States Forces Korea, the U.S.-South Korea Combined Forces Command, and United Nations Command, succeeding General Curtis Scaparrotti. He served until October 2018, and was succeeded by Robert B. Abrams. On November 4, 2016, Brooks was bestowed the Korean name Park Yu-jong by the ROK-US Alliance Friendship Association to show appreciation for his contributions to strengthening relations between the American and Korean armed forces. He also received a scroll and a taekwondo black belt and uniform inscribed with the moniker. Brooks retired on January 1, 2019, following the completion of his command assignment in Korea.

Retirement 
After retiring from the U.S. military, Brooks has served as a director on multiple corporate boards, including Diamondback Energy and the project management and engineering firm Jacobs, which contracts heavily with the U.S. military. He is also a principal with WestExec Advisors, a consulting firm that helps "defense corporations market their products to the Pentagon and other agencies," according to the Project On Government Oversight.

Awards and decorations

Family
 Father : Leo A. Brooks Sr. - Major General of the United States Army (retired)
 Brother : Leo A. Brooks Jr. - Brigadier General of the United States Army (retired)
 Uncle : Francis K. Brooks - the Vermont Senate (2017-2019)
 Cousin : Mark C. Quander - Brigadier General of the United States Army

Notes

References

External links

"Pursue Excellence in Everything": West Point's First African-American First Captain (archived from the original on 2016-08-07)
Vincent Brooks biography
Iraqis, coalition forces battle illegally-armed militias
Troops at Camp Liberty observe Dr. Martin Luther King Jr.'s birthday

1958 births
African-American United States Army personnel
United States Army generals
Living people
United States Military Academy alumni
Recipients of the Distinguished Service Medal (US Army)
Recipients of the Defense Superior Service Medal
Recipients of the Legion of Merit
United States Army personnel of the Iraq War
United States Army personnel of the War in Afghanistan (2001–2021)
Military personnel from Anchorage, Alaska
Military personnel from Sacramento, California
Military personnel from Alexandria, Virginia
People from Carmichael, California
Recipients of the Defense Distinguished Service Medal
Commanders, United States Forces Korea